XHSLR-FM is a radio station in San Luis Río Colorado, Sonora. Broadcasting on 107.9 FM, XHSLR is owned by Radio Grupo OIR and carries a grupera format known as La Consentida.

History
The station's concession was awarded in 1994 to Elsa Gabriela Guajardo Tijerina. The concession was transferred in 2000.

References

External links
La Consentida 107.9 Facebook

Radio stations in Sonora
Radio stations established in 1991